Corticeus is a genus of beetles belonging to the family Tenebrionidae.

Synonyms:
 Paraphloeus Seidlitz in Erichson, 1894
 Stenophloeus Blair, 1911
 Syncolydium Kolbe, 1897

Species:
 Corticeus australis (Champion, 1894)
 Corticeus cylindricus (Reitter, 1877)
 Corticeus hackeri (Carter, 1928)
 Corticeus sumatrensis (Pic, 1914)

References

Tenebrionidae